The nuqta from ; sometimes also spelled nukta) is a diacritic mark that was introduced in Devanagari and some other Indic scripts to represent sounds not present in the original scripts. It takes the form of a dot placed below a character. This idea is inspired from the Arabic script; for example, there are some letters in Urdu that share the same basic shape but differ in the placement of dots(s) or nuqta(s) in the Perso-Arabic script: the letter ع ain, with the addition of a nuqta on top, becomes the letter غ g͟hain.

Use in Devanagari

Perso-Arabic consonants
The term  is itself an example of the use of the nuqta.

In the text Dialect Accent Features for Establishing Speaker Identity, Manisha Kulshreshtha and Ramkumar Mathur write, "A few sounds, borrowed from the other languages like Persian and Arabic, are written with a dot (bindu or nuktā). Many people who speak Hindi as a second language, especially those who come from rural backgrounds and do not speak conventional Hindi (also called Khariboli), or speak in one of its dialects, pronounce these sounds as their nearest equivalents." For example, these rural speakers will assimilate the sound ɣ (Devanagari: ग़;) as ɡ (Devanagari: ग;).

With a renewed Hindi–Urdu language contact, many Urdu writers now publish their works in Devanagari editions. Since the Perso-Arabic orthography is preserved in Nastaʿlīq script Urdu orthography, these writers use the nuqta in Devanagari when transcribing these consonants. Sometimes, व़ is used to explicitly represent the /w/ consonant and to differentiate it from /v/ consonant व.

Dravidian consonants

Devanagari also includes coverage for the Dravidian consonants  /ɻ/;  /r/ and  /n/. (Respectively, these letters modify  /ɭ/;  /ɾ/ and  /n̪/).

Dardic consonants

Eastern Indo-Aryan letters

To represent the Eastern Nagari letter  representing /ɔ/, the consonant  is used in Devanagari.

In Maithili, there are four non-syllabic vowels: i̯, u̯, e̯, o̯ written in Devanagari as य़, व़, य़ॆ, व़ॊ. But colloquially, these are written without nuqta.

Similar diacritics

In Tamil script, the special character  is used like nuqta to represent non-native consonants.

In Thaana script of Maldives, one or many nuqtas are added to their native consonants to represent Perso-Arabic consonants, and each phoneme is encoded as a whole in the Unicode block (instead of a separate codepoint for the diacritic).

See also
Hindustani phonology
Hindi-Urdu transliteration
Hunterian transliteration

References

Works cited

Bibliography 
Vajpeyi, K. D. (Kishorī Dās Vājpayī; किशोरीदास वाजपेयी), Hindī shabdanushāsan हिन्दी शब्दनुशासन (1957, 1958, 1973, 1976, 1988).

External links
Nuqte ka funda | नुक़्ते का फ़ंडा | نقطے کا فنڈا (in Hindi/Urdu)
An Introduction to Indic scripts 
SCRIPT GRAMMAR FOR HINDI LANGUAGE

Brahmic diacritics
Hindustani orthography